The British Mountain Biking National Championships are organized by British Cycling, and the winner has the right to wear the national champion's jersey for the following year. The races are only open to riders of British nationality.

Venues

Results

Cross Country

Men

Women

Short Track

Men

Women

Downhill

Men

Women

4-Cross

Men

Women

Marathon

Men

Women

Notes

References
2005 XC Marathon results
2006 XC Marathon results 
2007 XC Marathon results
2008 DH results
2008 XC Marathon results
2008 XC results
2009 DH results 
2009 XC results 
2009 XC Marathon results 
2010 XC results 
2010 XC Marathon results
2011 DH results
2022 XC Marathon results

British National Championships
National mountain bike championships
National championships in the United Kingdom